Harold D'Arcy Wood (born 9 December 1936) is a semi-retired minister of the Uniting Church in Australia (UCA) and was President of the UCA Assembly from 1991 to 1994.  He has been active in ecumenism in Australia and globally.

Childhood and family

H. D'Arcy Wood (known as D'Arcy) is the son of the Reverend Dr A. Harold Wood OBE (1896–1989), a Methodist then Uniting Church minister and missionary in Tonga, and medical doctor Olive K. Wood (née O'Reilly). He is a brother to historian Elizabeth Wood-Ellem and actor Monica Maughan.  His cousin Winston O'Reilly was the second President of the UCA Assembly.

Education
Ordained into the Methodist Church of Australasia, Wood completed his theological education and doctorate at Princeton Theological Seminary.

Career
From 1974 to 1988, Rev. Dr Wood lectured in systematic theology and liturgy at the then Parkin-Wesley Theological College in Adelaide, South Australia. He was moderator of the Synod of South Australia from 1981 to 1983. Wood was a staff member of the Australian Council of Churches from 1969 to 1973 and president of that body from 1984 to 1988. He was also involved in the National Council of Churches in Australia since its formation.

His involvements include:
member of the Australian Institute of Health and Welfare's ethics committee
member of the World Council of Churches' special commission on Orthodox participation in the WCC and he contributed to that commission choosing to operate with a consensus decision making process, having been involved in its introduction in the UCA
past editorial committee member of the replacement for the Australian Hymn Book and Together in Song and compiler of the Companion to Together in Song (2006)

In 2015, Wood travelled to his country of birth to crown Tupou VI the King of Tonga, in a coronation ceremony at Centenary Church, Nuku'alofa.

Awards
1999: Percy Jones Award for outstanding service to liturgical music
2003: Named an associate of the Royal School of Church Music (based in the United Kingdom)

Publications

References

Australian Methodist ministers
Uniting Church in Australia presidents
Living people
1936 births
Uniting Church in Australia ministers